Andrea Treviso or Trevisi was an Italian physician.

he was either born in Occimiano in the territory of Monferrato or in Fontanello, near Novara. He is best known for publishing observations of a epidemic of febrile illness occurring during 1587-1588 in the duchy of Milan. His fame gained him appointment as physician to Isabella Clara Eugenia and her husband the Archduke of Austria, Albert, who at the time was governer of the Netherlands. He returned to Italy to Pavia, where he founded in 1614 a college for seven poor students at the Augustinian convent of Casale.

Chief works
De Causis nat. Moribus et curatione pestilentium febrium vulgo deitarum cum signis sive petechiis (Milan 1588).
Phoenix principu, sive Alberti Pii morientis Vita.

Bibliography

Year of birth uncertain
Year of death uncertain
16th-century Italian physicians
17th-century Italian physicians